The Popular Front was a political alliance in Burkina Faso. 
The FP was founded in October 1987 by that country's President, Blaise Compaoré, immediately after he came to power in a military coup d'état. The first member parties of the FP were the 
Union of Burkinabè Communists (UCB)
Burkinabè Communist Group (GCB)
Communist Struggle Union - The Flame (ULC-La Flamme).

In early 1991 the member parties were the
Organization for Popular Democracy - Labour Movement (ODP-MT)
Rally of Independent Social Democrats (RSDI)
National Convention of Progressive Patriots–Social Democratic Party (CNPP/PSD) 
Union of Democrats and Patriots of Burkina (UDPB) 
Burkinabè Communist Group (GCB)
Group of Patriotic Democrats (GDP)
Movement of Progressive Democrats (MDP) 
Group of Revolutionary Democrats (GDR)
Union of Social Democrats (USD)
African Independence Party (PIA)

In 1995 member parties were the 
Organization for Popular Democracy - Labour Movement (ODP-MT)
Movement of Progressive Democrats (MDP) 
Union of Democrats and Patriots of Burkina (UDPB)
Rally of Independent Social Democrats (RSDI)

The leader of the FP was Arsène Bongnessan Yé.

Defunct political party alliances in Burkina Faso
Popular fronts of communist states